Labrum Latin, defined as  "having the edge"
 
 Labrum (architecture), a large water-filled vessel or basin with an overhanging lip
 Labrum (arthropod mouthpart), a flap-like structure in front of the mouth in almost all extant Euarthropoda
 Labrum (surname), an English surname
 Delta Crateris, a star in the constellation Crater with the traditional name Labrum
 Acetabular labrum, a ring of cartilage that surrounds the acetabulum, the socket of the hip joint
 Glenoid labrum, a lip-like projection of cartilage on the human scapula (shoulder blade) surrounding the joint between the humerus and the shoulder blade

See also
 Labium (disambiguation)
 Labra (disambiguation)